General elections were held in Japan on 10 April 1946, the first after World War II. Voters had one, two or three votes, depending on how many MPs were elected from their constituency. The result was a victory for the Liberal Party, which won 141 of the 468 seats. Voter turnout was 72.1 percent.

Background
Prime Minister Kijūrō Shidehara, who had been appointed by the Emperor in October 1945, dissolved the House of Representatives in December 1945. Shidehara had been working with Allied occupation commander Douglas MacArthur to implement a new constitution and other political reforms.

In the months following the war, the Imperial Rule Assistance Association caucus broke up and three major political parties emerged in the Diet, loosely based around the major parties that stood in the 1937 election prior to the war. The Liberal Party was mainly composed of former Rikken Seiyūkai members, while the Progressive Party was mainly composed of former Rikken Minseitō members and the Socialist Party was mainly composed of former Shakai Taishūtō members.

This was the first time Japanese women were allowed to vote. 39 women were elected to office, the largest number elected until the 2005 elections. On the other hand, Taiwanese and Koreans in Japan had their rights to vote and to run for office suspended.

Following the election, there was a brief attempt to keep the Shidehara cabinet alive by having Shidehara join the Progressive Party, which the other major parties opposed. The Liberals and Progressives agreed to form a government under Liberal leader Ichiro Hatoyama on 2 May, but Hatoyama was promptly purged on 4 May and a new government formed under Foreign Minister Shigeru Yoshida, who officially became Prime Minister on 22 May.

Results

By prefecture

References 

General elections in Japan
Japan
1946 elections in Japan
April 1946 events in Asia
Election and referendum articles with incomplete results